The Communist Working Group (KAG) was a short-lived political party in Germany during the Weimar Republic that existed from 1921 to 1922. Created by the former head of the Communist Party, Paul Levi, the organization was formed following his ousting in response to criticism of the March uprising. In 1922, the KAG merged with the USPD.

References

Defunct communist parties in Germany
1921 establishments in Germany
1922 disestablishments in Germany